Patricia Josephine Smith (1920-2017) was an Australian international lawn bowler.

Bowls career
Pat was part of the fours team that won a silver medal at the 1986 Commonwealth Games in Edinburgh. She had previously competed at the 1982 Commonwealth Games.

She also won a gold medal and a silver medal, at the 1985 Asia Pacific Bowls Championships in Tweed Heads, New South Wales and bowled for New South Wales from 1972-1987.

Awards
She was awarded the Australian Sports Medal in 2000 and the Member of the Order of Australia in 1989 for services to bowls.

References 

Australian female bowls players
1920 births
2017 deaths
Commonwealth Games silver medallists for Australia
Commonwealth Games medallists in lawn bowls
Bowls players at the 1982 Commonwealth Games
Bowls players at the 1986 Commonwealth Games
Members of the Order of Australia
20th-century Australian women
Medallists at the 1986 Commonwealth Games